Sinekkale (literally "The castle of flies") is the archaeological remains of a big villa rustica in Turkey. The original name is unknown.

Location 
Sinekkale is to the north of some other sites of archaeological importance such as Karakabaklı and Işıkkale. The visitors follow the Turkish state highway  which runs in parallel to Mediterranean Sea coast. The last  is unaccesible by motor vehicles and the visitors have to walk through the bushy area.

History
The building is a typical Roman or Early Byzantine building. But there is a symbol of the Hellenistic Olba Kingdom carved on the lintel of one of the auxiliary buildings. The first description and a plan of Sinekkale were prepared in the early 1970s by Turkish art historian Semavi Eyice.   Friedrich Hild, Hansgerd Hellenkemper, Gilbert Dagron and Olivier Callot also visited the site and recently Ina Eichner made the most accurate description of the house.

The building
There are five rooms in the ground floor and six rooms in the first (mostly demolished) floor. There are visible consoles in the first floor which once supported a balcony. The house has a cistern, two bath rooms and a toilet.

References

Buildings and structures in Mersin Province
Silifke District
Tourist attractions in Mersin Province
History of Mersin Province
Villa rustica
Olba territorium